Geo is a microformat used for marking up WGS84 geographical coordinates (latitude;longitude) in (X)HTML. Although termed a "draft" specification, this is a formality, and the format is stable and in widespread use; not least as a sub-set of the published hCalendar and hCard microformat specifications, neither of which is still a draft.

Use of Geo allows parsing tools (for example other websites, or Firefox's Operator extension) to extract the locations, and display them using some other website or mapping tool, or to load them into a GPS device, index or aggregate them, or convert them into an alternative format.

Usage
If latitude is present, so must be longitude, and vice versa.
The same number of decimal places should be used in each value, including trailing zeroes.

The Geo microformat is applied using three HTML classes. For example, the marked-up text:

<div>Belvide: 52.686; -2.193</div>

becomes:

<div class="geo">Belvide: <span class="latitude">52.686</span>; <span class="longitude">-2.193</span></div>

by adding the class-attribute values "geo", "latitude" and "longitude".

This will display 

Belvide: 52.686; -2.193

and a geo microformat for that location, Belvide Reservoir, which will be detected, on this page,  by microformat parsing tools.

hCard
Each Geo microformat may be wrapped in an hCard microformat, allowing for the inclusion of personal, organisational or venue names, postal addresses, telephone contacts, URLs, pictures, etc.

Extensions
	
There are three proposals, none mutually-exclusive, to extend the geo microformat:
	
 geo-extension - for representing coordinates on other planets, moons etc., and with non-WGS84 schema
 geo-elevation - for representing altitude
 geo-waypoint - for representing routes and boundaries, using waypoints

Users

Organisations and websites using Geo include:

Flickr - on over three million photo pages
Geograph - on over one million photo pages
Google
Multimap - all map pages
OpenStreetMap - wiki pages about places, GPS traces and diary entries
Wikipedia - embedded in geo templates of map-link pages
German Wikipedia - ditto
Dutch Wikipedia - ditto
Swedish Wikipedia - ditto
Italian Wikipedia
Wikivoyage

Many of the organisations publishing hCard include a geo as part of that.

h-geo 

An alternative to Geo, h-geo, has been proposed. This is applied using three HTML classes. For example:

<div class="h-geo">Belvide: <span class="p-latitude">52.686</span>; <span class="p-longitude">-2.193</span>; <span class="p-altitude">120</span></div>

by adding the class-attribute values "h-geo", "p-latitude", "p-longitude", and "p-altitude".

See also
 GeoSPARQL, Geographic Information System (GIS) data for the W3C Semantic Web using the Resource Description Framework (RDF) and SPARQL
 Geo URI specified in  
 ISO 6709
 ICBM address, an older geotagging format
 Schema.org, web standard schema.org/geo.

Notes

References

Microformats
Geocodes